I Giganti are an Italian pop band founded in 1964.

In the 1960s, they had a number of hits including Una ragazza in due, an Italian version of Mister Murray's Down Comes the Rain. They are renowned for having released one of the earliest concept albums of Italian progressive rock in Italy called Terra in bocca. After disbanding in the early 1970s, I Giganti reformed in the 1990s and are still occasionally touring. Drummer Enrico Maria Papes is currently the only band member from the original lineup.

Personnel
Enrico Maria Papes - drums
Giacomo Di Martino - guitar
Sergio Di Martino - bass
Francesco Marsella - keyboards
Settimio "Silver" Corzani - bagpipe

Discography
1966 - I Giganti (Ri-Fi, RFM LP 14801)
1969 - Mille idee dei Giganti (Ri-Fi, RFM LP 14034)
1971 - Terra in bocca (Ri-Fi, RDZ-ST-14207)

External links
 

Musical groups established in 1964
Musical groups from Milan